Mysterons may refer to:

The Mysterons, a race of Extraterrestrials that appear in the 1960s TV series Captain Scarlet and the Mysterons and its 2000s remake, Gerry Anderson's New Captain Scarlet
"The Mysterons", the first episode of Captain Scarlet and the Mysterons
"Mysterons", a song by Portishead from their 1994 album Dummy
The Mysterons, a 1986-1987 psychobilly band from England
The Mysterons, a 2016-2017 psych-groove garage rock band from Amsterdam, the Netherlands

See also
Mysterians (disambiguation)
Mysterion (disambiguation)